Sandbakken Chapel is a chapel of the Church of Norway in Senja Municipality in Troms og Finnmark county, Norway. It is located in the village of Sandbakken on the island of Senja. It is an annex chapel for the Lenvik parish which is part of the Senja prosti (deanery) in the Diocese of Nord-Hålogaland. The white, wooden chapel was built in a long church style in 1976 using plans drawn up by the architect Torgeir Renland. The chapel seats about 148 people.

See also
List of churches in Nord-Hålogaland

References

Senja
Churches in Troms
Wooden churches in Norway
20th-century Church of Norway church buildings
Churches completed in 1976
1976 establishments in Norway
Long churches in Norway